This is a list of famous or notable citizens of Novi Sad (included in the list are natives as well as permanent and/or temporary residents).

Arts

Architecture
Greta Ferušić (1924–2022), Bosnian Jewish architect; born in Novi Sad

Literature and poetry

Aleksandar Tišma (1924–2003), writer; born in village Horgoš near Kanjiža and lived in Novi Sad
Branislav Nušić (1864–1938), Serbian novelist, playwright, comediographer, story writer, essayist, founder of modern Rhetoric in Serbia; lived in Novi Sad
Danilo Kiš (1935–1989), possibly the best-known ex-Yugoslavian writer alongside the Nobel laureate Ivo Andrić; lived in Novi Sad
Damjan Kaulić (1760–1810) Serbian publisher, bookseller and printer; only bookseller in Novi Sad until 1790; born in Sremski Karlovci and lived in Novi Sad.
Đura Jakšić (1831–1878), Serb poet, painter, narrator, playwright, bohemian, and patriot; born in Srpska Crnja and lived in Novi Sad
Jakov Ignjatović (1822–1889), writer; lived in Novi Sad
Jovan Grčić Milenko (1846–1875), poet; born in village Čerević in Beočin municipality; attended gymnasium in Novi Sad
Jovan Hadžić (1799–1869; pseudonym Miloš Svetić), one of the founders of Matica srpska and its first president; poet, literary historian, interpreter, lawyer; born in Sombor and lived in Novi Sad
Jovan Jovanović Zmaj (1833–1904), one of the best-known Serb poets; born in Novi Sad
Jovan Pačić (1771–1849), poet, painter and officer; born in Baja and lived in Novi Sad
Jovan Rajić (1726–1801), writer and historian; born in Sremski Karlovci and lived in Novi Sad
Kosta Trifković (1843–1875),  Serb writer, one of the best comediographers of the time; born in Novi Sad
Lajos Zilahy (1891−1974), author of the novel Two Prisoners
Laza Kostić (1841–1910), Serb man of letters; born in the village of Kovilj near Novi Sad, and lived in Novi Sad
Mika Antić (1932–1986), Serbian poet; born in village Mokrin near Kikinda and lived in Novi Sad
Milica Stojadinović-Srpkinja (1830–1878), writer; born in village Bukovac near Novi Sad
Mira Alečković (1924–2008), Serbian and Yugoslav poet; born in Novi Sad
Pavel Jozef Šafárik (1795–1861), Slovak philologist, poet; one of the first scientific Slavists; literary historian, historian and ethnographer; lived in Novi Sad
Pero Zubac (born 1945), Serbian and Yugoslav author, poet, screenwriter, academic, and journalist; born in Nevesinje in Bosnia and Herzegovina and resides in Novi Sad
Vasa Stajić (1878–1947), writer and professor; born in village Mokrin near Kikinda and lived in Novi Sad
Vasko Popa (1922–1991), Yugoslav poet of Romanian descent; lived in Novi Sad
Vuk Stefanović Karadžić (1787–1864), Serb linguist and major reformer of the Serbian language; spent 1809/1810 winter in Novi Sad
Zaharije Orfelin (1726–1785), Serbian polymath; born in Vukovar in Croatia and lived and died in Novi Sad.

Painting
Alfréd Kemény (1895–1945), Hungarian artist and art critic; born in Novi Sad
Dimitrije Avramović (1815–1855), painter; born in village Šajkaš in the Titel municipality and lived in Novi Sad
Emerik Feješ (1904–1969), Hungarian–Serbian painter; born in Osijek in Croatia and lived in Novi Sad
Igor Antić (born 1962), French–Serbian visual artist; born and raised in Novi Sad; son of Mika Antić
Minya Mikic (born 1975) born as Minja Višekruna, Italian artist, painter, and graphic designer; born in Novi Sad
Nikola Aleksić (1808–1873), painter; born in Arad in Romania and lived and worked in Novi Sad until 1826.
Stevan Todorović (1832–1925), Serbian painter and the founder of modern fencing and Sokol movement in Yugoslavia; born in Novi Sad
Uroš Predić (1857–1953), painter; born in village Orlovat in the Zrenjanin municipality and lived in Novi Sad
Vasa Ostojić (1730–1791), Serbian Baroque icon and fresco painter; worked on Uspenska crkva in Novi Sad; died in Novi Sad

Comics
Branislav Kerac (born 1952; also known as Bane Kerac), Serbian comic book creator; created and/or worked on Cat Claw, Tarzan, Zagor and Kobra comics
Gradimir Smudja (born 1956), Serbian cartoonist and painter in Italy and France; born in Novi Sad
Petar Meseldžija (born 1965), fantasy and comic book artist and illustrator
Sibin Slavković (born 1953), comic book artist, illustrator and editor; created and worked on Tarzan, Il Grande Blek, Tex; born in Žunjevići and resides in Novi Sad since 1983

Sculpture
Bojan Mikulić (born 1980), Serbian sculpture; realism and abstract art
Đorđe Jovanović (1861–1953) Serbian sculptor and full member of Serbian Academy of Sciences and Arts; born in Novi Sad
Jovan Pešić (1866–1936) Serbian sculptor and soldier

Multiple art disciplines
Emanuilo Janković (1758–1792), Serbian writer, dramatists, philosopher, translator, editor and scientist; born and raised in Novi Sad
Jovan Hristić (1933–2002), Serbian poet, playwright, essayist, literary and theater critic, translator, editor; died in Sremska Kamenica in Novi Sad
Mladen Dražetin (1951–2015), doctor of social sciences, intellectual, economist, theatrical creator, poet, writer and philosopher. He was born and died in Novi Sad.
Slobodan Jovanović (1869–1958) Serbian and Yugoslav writer, historian, lawyer, philosopher, literary critic, diplomat, and politician; born in Novi Sad

Entertainment

Fashion and modeling
Jovana Marjanović (born 1987), Serbian beauty pageant model; born in Novi Sad
Sanja Papić (born 1984), Serbian supermodel and beauty pageant titleholder

Film, theater, and television

Aleksandar Radenković (born 979), Serbian–German actor; born in Novi Sad
Bojana Ordinačev (born 1980), Serbian actress and model; born in Novi Sad
Boris Isaković (born 1966), film actor
Branka Veselinović (1918–2023), Serbian actress, oldest performing actress in Serbia; born in Stari Bečej and lived in Novi Sad
Dimitrije Banjac (born 1976), Serbian actor, comedian, screenwriter; born in Novi Sad
Dejan Ćirjaković (born 1979), television actor, comedian, screenwriter and musician
Gordana Kamenarović (born 1958), actress 
Draginja Ružić (1834–1905), one of the first Serbian professional actresses; born in Vranjevo and lived in Novi Sad
Dušan Kovačević (born 1948), playwright, scriptwriter, film director, academic, served as the ambassador of Serbia in Lisbon, Portugal; born in Mrđenovac and studied in Novi Sad
Iván Petrovich (1894–1962), Serbian–German film actor and singer; born in Novi Sad
Jelena Tinska (born 1953; born as Jelena Petrović), Serbian actress, ballerina, dancer, writer, columnist, and television presenter
Joakim Vujić (1772–1847), theatrical worker; lived in Novi Sad
Josif Tatić (1946–2013), Serbian film and television actor
Lena Bogdanović (born 1974), film actress
Marija Omaljev-Grbić (born 1982), Croatian–American film, theater and television actress; born in Novi Sad
Márton Garas (1881–1930), Hungarian film director; born in Novi Sad
Mihailo Janketić (1938–2019), Serbian actor
Mira Banjac (born 1929), actress; born in Erdevik in the Šid municipality and resides in Novi Sad
Nikola Škorić (born 1976), Serbian actor, comedian and screenwriter; born in Rijeka in Croatia and lives in Novi Sad
Nina Seničar (born 1985), Serbian film and television actress; model; born in Novi Sad
Radoslav Milenković (born 1958), actor and theater director
Stojan Matavulj (born 1961), Croatian actor; born in Novi Sad
Vladimir Tintor (born in 1978), Serbian actor; born in Novi Sad
Želimir Žilnik (born 1942), award-winning film director; born in Novi Sad
Zorka Todosić (1864–1936), Serbian stage actress and operetta singer; born in Novi Sad

Music

Aleksandra Vrebalov (born 1970), Serbian composer based in New York City; lived in Novi Sad
Baruch Arnon (born 1940), Serbian Jewish classical pianist and music teacher; born in Novi Sad
Boris Kovač (born 1955), musician and composer from Novi Sad
Cveta Majtanović (born 1986), singer, songwriter, psychologist, engineer, winner of the 2004 Idol Serbia, Montenegro & Macedonia competition
Darko Radovanović (1975–2011) Serbian singer; born in Novi Sad
Đorđe Balašević (1953–2021), prominent Serbian songwriter and singer; born in Novi Sad
Isidor Bajić (1878–1915), composer; born in Kula, lived in Novi Sad
Janika Balaž (1925–1988), musician; lived in Novi Sad
Josif Runjanin (1821–1878), Serb composer and lieutenant-colonel in the Austro-Hungarian Army; born in Vinkovci in Srem (then part of Austrian Empire); died in Novi Sad
Ljiljana Petrović (1939–2020), singer; born in Bosanski Brod in Bosnia and Herzegovina and raised in Novi Sad
Marko Nešić (1873–1938), Serbian composer and tamburitza musician
Mihajlo Obrenov (born 1982; pseudonym MiKKa), musician and composer; founder of Crime:Scene records; from Novi Sad
Milenko Paunović (1889–1924), Serbian composer and writer; author of the first Serbian musical drama; born in the village of Újszentiván in Hungary and lived in Novi Sad
Mitar Subotić (1961–1999), known as Suba and Rex Illusivi; eclectic musician and producer, electronic music pioneer in SFR Yugoslavia; born and raised in Novi Sad
Nataša Bekvalac (born 1980), Serbian pop singer
Rada Adžić (born 1976; pseudonym Dara Bubamara), Serbian pop-folk singer
Stefan Milenković (born 1977), Serbian violinist; director of the Concert hall of Novi Sad since 2020
Svetozar Saša Kovačević (born 1950), Serbian composer, music pedagogue and church organist; born in Zabalj and lived in Novi Sad
Tea Tairović (born 1996) Serbian pop-folk singer and songwriter
Tijana Bogićević (born 1981), Serbian singer; represented Serbia in the Eurovision Song Contest in 2011 and 2017; born in Novi Sad

Sciences

Adolf Hempt (1874–1943), biologist; founder of the Pasteur Institute in Novi Sad; born in Novi Sad
Albert Einstein (1879-1955), theoretical physicist of profound genius; widely regarded as the greatest scientist of the 20th century; lived in Novi Sad 1905-1907 (in Kisačka Street 20) with his wife, Mileva Marić
Bogdan Gavrilović (1864–1947), mathematician physicist, philosopher and educator; born in Novi Sad
Mileva Marić (1875–1948), Serb mathematician; Albert Einstein's first wife; born in Titel and lived in Novi Sad
Olga Hadžić (1946–2019), mathematician; rector of the University of Novi Sad and the first woman rector in Serbia; born and lived in Novi Sad
Pavle Trpinac (1905–1991) Serbian chemist and professor; born and raised in Novi Sad
Vojtěch Šafařík (1829–1902) Czech chemist of Slovakian descent; born in Novi Sad

Scholars 
Branko Mikasinovich (born 1938), Serbian-American slavist, journalist

Business
Ignjat Sopron (1821–1894), German journalist, publisher, and printer; born in Novi Sad
Milan Mandarić (born 1938), Serbian-American businessman, born in Gospić in Croatia and grew up in Novi Sad
Ratko Butorović (1956–2013), businessmen, former owner of FK Vojvodina, Hotel Park, and Hotel Leopold I 
Robert Čoban (born 1968), co-owner and president of Color Press Group; born in Bač and resides in Novi Sad

Politics

Aleksandra Đanković (born 1987), politician, born in Novi Sad
Čedomir Božić (born 1984), politician; born in Novi Sad
Jaša Tomić (1856–1922), publicist and politician; lived in Novi Sad
Josip Jelačić (1801–1859), the Ban of Croatia 1848-1859; born in Petrovaradin
Jovan Dejanović (1927–2019), Serbian Yugoslav politician; mayor of Novi Sad (1974–1982); responsible for the construction of Liberty Bridge, modern building of the Serbian National Theatre, and SPC Vojvodina
Maja Gojković (born 1963), Serbian politician; mayor of Novi Sad (2004–2008); president of the National Assembly of Serbia (2014–2020)
Milan Đurić (born 1977), Serbian politician and lawyer, mayor of Novi Sad (2022–Incumbent)
Miloš Vučević (born 1974), Serbian politician; mayor of Novi Sad (2012–2022)
Nada Lazić (born 1950), politician; resides in Novi Sad
Jovan Subotić (1817–1886), politician and writer; born in village Dobrinci near Ruma and lived in Novi Sad
Slobodan Jovanović (1869–1958), prime minister of the Yugoslav government in exile during World War II; born in Novi Sad
Stevan Branovački (1804–1880), advocate, politician, mayor of Novi Sad, president of Matica Srpska; one of the founders of Serbian National Theatre; lived in Novi Sad
Svetozar Miletić (1826–1901), advocate, politician, mayor of Novi Sad, the political leader of Serbs in Vojvodina; born in the village Mošorin in Šajkaška
Yosef Lapid (1931–2008), justice minister of Israel;  born in Novi Sad

Philanthropy

Marija Trandafil (1816–1883), Serbian philanthropist; helped rebuild Novi Sad after the 1848 Hungarian Revolution
Sava Tekelija (1761–1842), first Serbian doctor of law; founder of Tekelijanum; president of Matica srpska; philanthropist, noble and merchant; born in Arad in Romania
Savka Subotić (1834–1918), Serbian political activist, philanthropist and one of the first leading feminists in Vojvodina

Military
Đorđe Sečujac (1715-1759), Serb Habsburg military commander; lived in Novi Sad
Jakov Mrvica (1978-2004), born as Željko Mrvica, Israeli-Serbian military person; lived in Novi Sad

Sports

Basketball
Darko Miličić (born 1985), professional basketball player for the Orlando Magic, taken 2nd overall in the 2003 NBA Draft; born in Novi Sad
Dragan Tarlać (born 1973), retired professional basketball player with Olympiakos, Chicago Bulls, Real Madrid, and CSKA Moscow; born and grew up in Novi Sad
Jovo Stanojević (born 1977), professional basketball player; born in Sombor and resides in Novi Sad
Milan Gurović (born 1975), professional basketball player with an illustrious career on the Serbia-Montenegro national team and club career stops all over Europe; born and grew up in Novi Sad

Football
Aleksandar Sedlar (born 1991), professional footballer 
Damir Stojak (born 1975), retired professional footballer
Danijel Aleksić (born 1991), professional footballer; born in Pula in Croatia, raised in Veternik, and lived in Novi Sad
Dušan Tadić (born 1988), professional footballer born in Bačka Topola and residing in Novi Sad 
Gojko Kačar (born 1987), professional footballer
Goran Šaula (born 1970), retired professional footballer
Janko Sanković (born 1960s), retired professional football goalkeeper 
Mijat Gaćinović (born 1995), professional footballer
Milan Jovanović (born 1981), retired professional footballer born in Bajina Bašta and residing in Novi Sad
Milan Stepanov (born 1983), retired professional footballer; born in Kisač near Novi Sad
Miloš Krasić (born 1984), retired professional footballer born in Kosovska Mitrovica and residing in Novi Sad
Ljubomir Lovrić (1920–1994), late professional goalkeeper and later football coach; born and raised in Novi Sad
Radoslav Samardžić (born 1970), retired professional footballer; born in the village of Karavukovo in the Odžaci municipality and resides in Novi Sad
Sergej Milinković-Savić (born 1995), professional footballer; born in Lleida in Spain and lived in Novi Sad
Slaviša Jokanović (born 1968), retired professional footballer currently working as manager; born and raised in Novi Sad
Srđan Plavšić (born 1995), professional footballer
Vanja Milinković-Savić (born 1997), professional footballer; born in Ourense in Spain and lived in Novi Sad
Vujadin Boškov (1931–2014), professional footballer and famous coach; born in the nearby village of Begeč; spent most of his life in Novi Sad
Željko Brkić (born 1986), professional footballer

Handball
Aleksandra Stamenić (born 1998), professional handball player; born in Novi Sad
Nataša Lovrić (born 2000), professional handball player; born in Novi Sad

Shooting
Aleksandra Ivošev (born 1974), Olympic gold medalist

Tennis
Monika Seleš (born 1973), former World No. 1 female tennis player; born in Novi Sad
Tatjana Ječmenica (born 1978), tennis coach; former tennis player

Track and field
Ivana Vuleta (born 1990; born as Ivana Španović), professional long jumper; born in Zrenjanin and residing in Novi Sad

See also
 List of honorary citizens of Novi Sad
 List of people from Belgrade

People
Novi Sad
Novi Sad